Kent Stotz is an American motorcycle racer and founder of the Stotz Racing motorcycle team. Stotz has won 4 AMA Prostar Street Bike Shootout National Championships and broken the speed record multiple times.

Early career
Stotz began motorcycle racing at the age of 19. He started in motocross, but was told he was too old to go to nationals. He then turned to drag racing. From 1981 to 1986 he worked with T.J. Hofmeister on the Mr. Turbo Funny Bike team as a mechanic and racer. Stotz worked closely with the AMA to develop rules that would eventually govern the AMA/Prostar Streetbike Shootout class.

Stotz Racing
Kent started Stotz Racing in 1992, winning his first championship in 1995. After his new title though, his family and home business started to take time out of the time spent on the track. It wasn't until 1998 that he had won his next AMA Prostar championship. In 1999, he was called by Charlie Keller of the Honda Rider's Club of America and was asked to use their CBR1100XX in trade for a sponsorship.

In 1999, he set a new speed record of 180.75 mph. The very next year he broke it again and set the bar to 185.15 mph. In 2001, he set the national record for time and speed at 7.75 seconds at 189.31 mph and won his third championship. His fourth and final championship came in 2002. In 2004, he broke the national records 7 times and was the first person to set a 200 mph record.

References 

1958 births
Living people
American motorcycle racers
Sportspeople from Chicago